On 21 December 2022, Volodomyr Zelenskyy, the president of Ukraine, visited the United States. During his 10-hour visit, Zelenskyy met with Joe Biden, the president of the United States, held a joint press conference, and addressed a joint session of the United States Congress. Secretary of State of the United States Antony Blinken announced a US$1.85 billion military aid package for Ukraine ahead of Zelenskyy's visit. Zelenskyy's visit to Washington, D.C. is believed to be his first overseas trip since the Russian invasion of Ukraine in February 2022.

Background 
On 24 February 2022, Russia invaded Ukraine in a major escalation of the Russo-Ukrainian War. At the beginning of the invasion, Zelenskyy declined offers of evacuation from the United States. The United States assisted Ukraine and Zelenskyy by other means, with the U.S. giving the most assistance to Ukraine throughout the invasion of any foreign nation—around US$50 billion at the time of Zelenskyy's visit. 

This was Zelenskyy's first visit to the White House, although he had met with Biden's predecessor, Donald Trump, in 2019, "on the sidelines of the United Nations General Assembly’s opening sessions in New York."

Informal discussions about the trip began on December 11, and after the invitation was extended and accepted, planning began on December 18. Zelenskyy traveled by train to Przemyśl, Poland, where he was joined by U.S. ambassador Bridget Brink, "transported in a U.S. Embassy vehicle to an airport in Rzeszów," and then traveled, via a U.S. Air Force jet typically used by Cabinet-level officials, to  Joint Base Andrews.

Visit to the United States

Meeting with Joe Biden 
Zelenskyy arrived in the country from Rzeszów, Poland aboard a United States Air Force jet. During his visit to the United States, Zelenskyy met with the president, Joe Biden. Biden pledged a Patriot missile system for the use of Ukraine against aircraft, ballistic, and cruise missiles. The Patriot system had been previously asked for by Ukraine.

Zelenskyy presented Biden with a medal that had been awarded to a Ukrainian officer responsible for a U.S.-furnished  HIMARS system "that the officer wanted Biden to have."

Speech to Congress 

After meeting with Biden, Zelenskyy gave a speech, in English, to a joint session of the United States Congress. In his speech, Zelenskyy urged more aid for Ukraine, saying that "Ukraine is alive and kicking". Following his speech, Zelenskyy gave a Ukrainian flag signed by Ukrainian soldiers fighting at the Battle of Bakhmut to Vice President of the United States Kamala Harris and Speaker of the United States House of Representatives Nancy Pelosi. In return, Pelosi presented Zelenskyy with a U.S. flag, which had flown over the Capitol that day. Zelenskyy carried the flag with him as he departed the House chamber.

Pelosi later compared the visit to Winston Churchill's address to Congress, at which her father Rep. Thomas D'Alesandro Jr. was present, on December 26, 1941.

Reaction

The Associated Press, citing a security analyst, wrote "Zelenskyy's mission of keeping America engaged is a difficult one, but he is up to the task." David Sanger of the New York Times argued that Zelenskyy's true purpose was appealling "to the minority of Republicans who are reluctant to spend more in a conflict whose end is nowhere in sight..." To this end, Zelenskyy reminded Congress that Iran's assistance to Russia might ultimately impact close U.S. ally Israel, essentially urging Congressmembers hesitant to invest more in Ukraine to see it as part of a broader defense of Western interests.

Gallery

See also

 
 2023 visit by Joe Biden to Ukraine
 2023 visit by Volodymyr Zelenskyy to the United Kingdom

References

External links

 Transcript of Volodymyr Zelenskyy's speech to the joint session of Congress

2022 in international relations
2022 in American politics
2022 in Washington, D.C.
December 2022 events in the United States
Events affected by the 2022 Russian invasion of Ukraine
State visits by Ukrainian leaders
Diplomatic visits
Joint sessions of the United States Congress
117th United States Congress
Presidency of Joe Biden
United States
Ukraine–United States relations